Tobias Geisser (born 13 February 1999) is a Swiss professional ice hockey defenseman currently playing for EV Zug of the National League (NL) and the Swiss national team.

Playing career
Geisser was drafted 120th overall in the 2017 NHL Entry Draft by the Washington Capitals and signed an entry-level contract on 22 March 2018.

Following the conclusion of his entry-level contract with the Capitals, and unable to make inroads within the organization, Geisser as an impending restricted free agent opted to return to Switzerland and re-join former club, EV Zug of the NL, on a three-year deal on 15 June 2022.

International play
Geisser represented Switzerland at the 2021 IIHF World Championship.

Career statistics

Regular season and playoffs

International

References

External links

1999 births
Living people
Expatriate ice hockey players in the United States
Hershey Bears players
People from Stans
Sportspeople from Nidwalden
Swiss expatriate ice hockey people
Swiss expatriate sportspeople in the United States
Swiss ice hockey defencemen
Washington Capitals draft picks
EV Zug players